Kikuyu is a town in Kiambu County, Kenya, which grew from a settlement of colonial missionaries. It is about 20 minutes from Nairobi via a number of routes, including a dual carriage road, and has a railway station on the Mombasa – Malaba Railway Line. The town is named after the Kikuyu/Gĩkũyũ people, the major ethnicity that settled in the area. As of 2019 the total population is 323,881.

Due to its geology and rich soil texture, the chief activities are livestock and crop farming. The jurisdiction also includes Ondiri Wetland which is the source of the Nairobi River. With the recent completion of the Southern Bypass that connects Mombasa to Nairobi via Kikuyu, the town is poised for greater growth as is the only town on the Bypass. Kikuyu hosts a Sub-County Administration which is the administrative division in Kiambu County.

History
The town has some British colonial history links, like the Right Reverend Musa Gitau (Swahili for Moses Gitau), an African believer in democracy who led among the first Christian faithful during colonial times. He lived and worked in the town as a reverend and in his honour two schools were named after him.

An interdenominational missionary conference held in Kikuyu in June 1913 provoked the so-called Kikuyu controversy, which briefly roiled the Anglican churches from December 1913 to February 1914

Institutions within Kikuyu 
Some of the major institutions in Kikuyu are;

1. Research Institutions 
Kenya Forestry Research Institute (KEFRI), Kenya Agricultural Research Institute (KARI), and Kenya Trypnomiasis Research Institute (KETRI)

2. Academic Institutions 
University of Nairobi – Kikuyu Campus which hosts the College of Education and External Studies. It also hosts the Presbyterian University of Eastern Africa (PUEA), Thogoto Teachers Training College, Kikuyu Commercial College, Vantage Teachers College and Kismart College among others.

Secondary schools
Kikuyu is home to two National High Schools; Alliance High School and Alliance Girls High School. It also has several day and boarding schools including  Kahuho Uhuru High School, Rungiri Secondary School, Uthiru Girls High School, Kikuyu Day Secondary School, Muhu Secondary School, Gichuru Memorial School, Musa Gitau Secondary School, Karai Day Secondary School, Kirangari High School, Moi Girls Kamangu, Green Garden Girls High School, Muguga High school, Star Sheikh Academies, Mary Leakey Girls School, Kevin Carey High School and Mai-a-ihii Secondary School.

Primary schools 
Primary schools include Kikuyu Township Primary School, The Green Garden Schools, Jeverden Highlands Academy, St. Veronica I.L.C, Kidfarmaco Primary School, Musa Gitau Primary School, Uthiru Genesis School, Muthiga Academy, Damacrest Schools, Patmos Montessori School, Mama Ngina Primary School, Fairlawns Primary School, Utafiti Primary School, Nguriunditu primary school, Kandeng'wa Primary School, Kid Zone School, Valley Crest Academy, Njumbi Primary School, Gicharani Primary School, Thogoto Primary School, Wambaa Primary School, Kanyiha Primary School, Magutuini Primary School, Thirime Primary School, Mai ai hii Primary School, Gikambura Primary School, Gacio School and Shalom Academy, Ellys school, Great Vision School, Golden Heights Academy, Roots Academy, Mabawa kids Academy.

Historical Sites
There are several historical sites within the town, such as the caves dug by Indian 'coollies' when constructing the Kenya-Uganda railway. These caves are found just below the town under the railway facing Magana farm. Other sites include the graves of two explorers who were killed by lions in the 19th century at Kanyariri, a few meters from where Fort Smith was situated; the Undiri swamp, and the PCEA Church of the Torch, the first building at Thogoto.

Transport
Transport to the capital and other places is available in form of matatus, minibuses and trains. It is also conveniently served through most Taxi – Cab services with rates averaging Kshs 1800 – 2500 (as of Jan 2016). Many institutions have developed in this town, including a major eye unit hospital, a Christian university, and many primary and secondary schools. Recreational facilities and accommodations include Sigona Golf Club, the Wida Highway Motel, Kari Holiday Retreat Centre, and the PCEA Lay Training Centre. It has developed into an industrial town that boasts many factories that range from the metallic to the medical sector.

See also 

 Kabete, a town in the Kikuyu division

References 

Kiambu County
Populated places in Kenya